Oleg Petrovich Vasilenko (born 6 October 1973) is a Russian professional football manager. He was most recently the manager of FC Fakel Voronezh.

Coaching career
Previously he worked as a manager with FC Ural and FC Sochi and Latvian Virsliga side RFS.

On 21 August 2019, he was appointed manager of FC Avangard Kursk, where he was previously an assistant coach. He left the club on 23 December 2019. On 14 September 2020, he was appointed head coach of FC Fakel Voronezh. Under his management, Fakel finished 2nd in the 2021–22 Russian Football National League to secure promotion to the Russian Premier League for the first time since the 2001 season. Vasilenko left Fakel by mutual consent on 6 September 2022, after Fakel started the 2022–23 Russian Premier League with 4 points and no wins in the first 8 games.

Honours
 Russian Second Division, Zone South best manager: 2009
 A Lyga Manager of the Round: 2017 second round, 2017 third round

References

External links
Career summary by Footballfacts

1973 births
Living people
Russian people of Ukrainian descent
Russian football managers
FC Zhemchuzhina Sochi managers
FC Dinamo Minsk managers
FC Ural Yekaterinburg managers
FK Riteriai managers
FK RFS managers
FC Fakel Voronezh managers
Russian Premier League managers
Russian expatriate football managers
Russian expatriate sportspeople in Belarus
Expatriate football managers in Belarus
Russian expatriate sportspeople in Latvia
Expatriate football managers in Latvia
Russian expatriate sportspeople in Lithuania
Expatriate football managers in Lithuania